This is a list of years in Afghanistan. See also the timeline of Afghan history.  For only articles about years in Afghanistan that have been written, see :Category:Years in Afghanistan.

Twenty-first century

Twentieth century

Nineteenth century

Eighteenth century

Seventeenth century

Sixteenth century

See also 
 Timeline of Afghan history
 Solar Hijri calendar#In Afghanistan

Cities in Afghanistan:
 Timeline of Kabul
 Timeline of Herat

 
Afghanistan history-related lists
Afghanistan